Worldchanger is the second album by Jørn Lande's solo project Jorn, released in 2001. It features a mix of tracks that represent different genres including hard rock, progressive rock, doom metal and power metal.

Track listing
All songs written by Jørn Lande and Tore Moren except where noted.

 "Tungur Knivur" (Lande) - 6:17
 "Sunset Station" - 4:30
 "Glow in the Dark" (Lande) - 4:38
 "House of Cards" - 4:56
 "Bless the Child" - 4:40
 "Captured" - 4:08
 "Worldchanger" - 4:51
 "Christine" (Lande) - 2:53
 "Bridges Will Burn" - 5:32

Personnel
Jørn Lande - lead vocals
Tore Moren - guitar
Sid Ringsby - bass
Jan Axel "Hellhammer" Blomberg - drums

2001 albums
Jørn Lande albums
Frontiers Records albums